

The Osprey Site (Smithsonian trinomial: 35CS130) is an archeological site located near Bandon, Oregon, United States. Associated with the Coquille people, it is the largest known complex of fishing weirs on the Oregon coast, encompassing over 3000 identified wooden weir stakes organized into 25 discrete weir features. Radiocarbon dating suggests the site was in use possibly as early as 560 to 670 CE, and historic accounts indicate it continued in use into the 1850s. The site has also yielded more split wood lattice panels than any other weir location along the Northwest coast. It is a site of outstanding cultural importance to the Coquille people, and great research importance for understanding variation in weir technology during the precontact and postcontact periods.

The Osprey Site was listed on the National Register of Historic Places in 2001.

See also
National Register of Historic Places listings in Coos County, Oregon

Notes

References

External links
, National Register of Historic Places cover documentation
Oregon Historic Sites Database entry

National Register of Historic Places in Coos County, Oregon
Native American Archeological Sites of the Oregon Coast MPS